The Southern Textile Association (STA) is a nonprofit trade organization for individuals in the textile and related industries with an interest in textile manufacturing.  It was established in 1908.

STA members can network with their peers in all sectors of the textile industry.

External links 
 Official homepage of The Southern Textile Association

Textile industry of the United States
Textile industry associations